Elaeocarpus bifidus, known in Hawaiian as kalia, is a species of flowering plant in the family Elaeocarpaceae that is endemic to the islands of Kauaʻi and Oʻahu in Hawaiʻi

The kalia is a medium-sized evergreen tree, and has fruits that resemble olives.  Formerly the bark was used to make rope, and the branches were used in the construction of thatched roofs.

References 

bifidus
Species described in 1832
Flora of Hawaii